The Stadtwerke Ratingen Mehrkampf-Meeting is an annual track and field meeting for decathlon and heptathlon held in Ratingen, Germany. Established in 1997, it is part of the World Athletics Combined Events Tour and takes place in May.

Records

Results
Key:

Men

Women

References

External links
Official website

Decathlon
Annual track and field meetings
Recurring sporting events established in 1997
World Athletics Combined Events Tour
Athletics competitions in Germany
1997 establishments in Germany